Emma Township may refer to the following townships in the United States:

 Emma Township, White County, Illinois
 Emma Township, Harvey County, Kansas

See also 
 Lake Emma Township, Hubbard County, Minnesota